Menjan (also Romanized as Menjān and Manjan; also known as Mīkhān and Minjān) is a village in Qolqol Rud Rural District, Qolqol Rud District, Tuyserkan County, Hamadan Province, Iran. At the 2006 census, its population was 581, in 157 families.

References 

Populated places in Tuyserkan County